Patrick Huard (born January 2, 1969) is a Quebec-born Canadian actor, writer and comedian.

Career
Patrick Huard broke into the Quebec show business scene in 1989 as a comedian, actor and television personality. A hard-working multifaceted talent, he came to the attention of English Canada in the very popular Les Boys franchise, and cemented his credentials as the star of Bon Cop, Bad Cop, which he also co-wrote, now the most successful domestic film at the box office in the history of Canadian cinema. In 2007, he directed his first movie, Les 3 P’tits cochons, which was a hit in Quebec and won the Golden Reel Award for the top-grossing film of the year.

Filmography

Feature films
 1997: Heads or Tails (J’en suis!)
 1997: Les Boys – T-Guy
 1998: Les Boys II
 2000: Life After Love (La vie après l’amour)
 2000: Stardom – Montreal Talk-Show Host
 2001: Les Boys III
 2003: How My Mother Gave Birth to Me During Menopause (Comment ma mère accoucha de moi durant sa ménopause)
 2003: Red Nose (Nez rouge)
 2003: Sur le seuil
 2004: Machine Gun Molly (Monica la mitraille)
 2005: Maman Last Call
 2006: Bon Cop, Bad Cop – David Bouchard
 2007: The 3 L'il Pigs (Les 3 p'tits cochons)
 2009: Cadavres
 2010: Funkytown – Bastien Lavallée
 2011: Starbuck – David Wozniak
 2012: Le Projet Omerta – Steve Bélanger
 2014: Mommy - Paul Béliveau
 2015: My Internship in Canada - Steve Guibord
 2017: Bon Cop, Bad Cop 2 - David Bouchard
 2020: My Very Own Circus (Mon cirque à moi) - Bill

Television
 1993-1994: Là tu parles
 1998: Réseaux
 2006: Au nom de la loi
 2006: Cover Girl
 2006: Le Cœur a ses raisons
 2006: Music Hall
 2007: Taxi 0-22

Awards and accolades

References

External links
  Patrick Huard official website
  Patrick Huard official website
 

1969 births
Living people
Male actors from Montreal
Canadian male film actors
Canadian male television actors
French Quebecers
Comedians from Montreal
20th-century Canadian male actors
21st-century Canadian male actors
Canadian Comedy Award winners